A personal digital assistant (PDA), also known as a handheld PC, is a variety mobile device which functions as a personal information manager. PDAs have been mostly displaced by the widespread adoption of highly capable smartphones, in particular those based on iOS and Android, seeing a rapid decline in use after 2007.

A PDA has an electronic visual display. Most models also have audio capabilities, allowing usage as a portable media player, and also enabling many of them to be used as telephones. By the early 2000's, nearly all PDA models had the ability access the Internet, intranets or extranets via Wi-Fi or Wireless WANs, and generally include a web browser. Sometimes, instead of buttons, PDAs employ touchscreen technology.

The first PDA, the Organiser, was released in 1984 by Psion, followed by Psion's Series 3, in 1991. The latter began to resemble the more familiar PDA style, including a full keyboard. The term PDA was first used on January 7, 1992 by Apple Inc. CEO John Sculley at the Consumer Electronics Show in Las Vegas, Nevada, referring to the Apple Newton. In 1994, IBM introduced the first PDA with analog cellular phone functionality, the IBM Simon, which can also be considered the first smartphone. Then in 1996, Nokia introduced a PDA with digital cellphone functionality, the 9000 Communicator. Another early entrant in this market was Palm, with a line of PDA products which began in March 1996. Palm would eventually be the dominant vendor of PDAs until the rising popularity of Pocket PC devices in the early 2000s. By the mid-2000s most PDAs had morphed into smartphones as classic PDAs without cellular radios were increasingly becoming uncommon.

Typical features
A typical PDA has a touchscreen for navigation, a memory card slot for data storage, and IrDA, Bluetooth and/or Wi-Fi. However, some PDAs may not have a touchscreen, using softkeys, a directional pad, and a numeric keypad or a thumb keyboard for input. To have the functions expected of a PDA, a device's software typically includes an appointment calendar, a to-do list, an address book for contacts, a calculator, and some sort of memo (or "note") program. PDAs with wireless data connections also typically include an email client and a Web browser, and may or may not include telephony functionality.

Touchscreen

Many of the original PDAs, such as the Apple Newton and Palm Pilot, featured a touchscreen for user interaction, having only a few buttons—usually reserved for shortcuts to often-used programs. Some touchscreen PDAs, including Windows Mobile devices, had a detachable stylus to facilitate making selections. The user interacts with the device by tapping the screen to select buttons or issue commands, or by dragging a finger (or the stylus) on the screen to make selections or scroll.

Typical methods of entering text on touchscreen PDAs include:

 A virtual keyboard, where a keyboard is shown on the touchscreen. Text is entered by tapping the on-screen keyboard with a finger or stylus.
 An external keyboard connected via USB, Infrared port, or Bluetooth. Some users may choose a chorded keyboard for one-handed use.
 Handwriting recognition, where letters or words are written on the touchscreen, often with a stylus, and the PDA converts the input to text. Recognition and computation of handwritten horizontal and vertical formulas, such as "1 + 2 =", may also be a feature.
 Stroke recognition allows the user to make a predefined set of strokes on the touchscreen, sometimes in a special input area, representing the various characters to be input. The strokes are often simplified character shapes, making them easier for the device to recognize. One widely known stroke recognition system is Palm's Graffiti.

Despite research and development projects, end-users experience mixed results with handwriting recognition systems. Some find it frustrating and inaccurate, while others are satisfied with the quality of the recognition.

Touchscreen PDAs intended for business use, such as the BlackBerry and Palm Treo, usually also offer full keyboards and scroll wheels or thumbwheels to facilitate data entry and navigation. Many touchscreen PDAs support some form of external keyboard as well. Specialized folding keyboards, which offer a full-sized keyboard but collapse into a compact size for transport, are available for many models. External keyboards may attach to the PDA directly, using a cable, or may use wireless technology such as infrared or Bluetooth to connect to the PDA. Newer PDAs, such as the HTC HD2, Apple iPhone, Apple iPod Touch, and Palm Pre, Palm Pre Plus, Palm Pixi, Palm Pixi Plus, Google Android (operating system) include more advanced forms of touchscreen that can register multiple touches simultaneously. These "multi-touch" displays allow for more sophisticated interfaces using various gestures entered with one or more fingers.

Memory cards
Although many early PDAs did not have memory card slots, now most have either some form of Secure Digital (SD) slot, a CompactFlash slot or a combination of the two. Although designed for memory, Secure Digital Input/Output (SDIO) and CompactFlash cards are available that provide accessories like Wi-Fi or digital cameras, if the device can support them. Some PDAs also have a USB port, mainly for USB flash drives.  Some PDAs use microSD cards, which are electronically compatible with SD cards, but have a much smaller physical size.

Wired connectivity
While early PDAs connected to a user's personal computer via serial ports or another proprietary connection, many today connect via a USB cable. Older PDAs were unable to connect to each other via USB, as their implementations of USB didn't support acting as the "host". Some early PDAs were able to connect to the Internet indirectly by means of an external modem connected via the PDA's serial port or "sync" connector, or directly by using an expansion card that provided an Ethernet port.

Wireless connectivity
Most PDAs utilize Bluetooth, a popular wireless protocol for mobile devices. Bluetooth can be used to connect keyboards, headsets, GPS receivers, and other nearby accessories. It's also possible to transfer files between PDAs that have Bluetooth. Many PDAs have Wi-Fi wireless network connectivity and can connect to Wi-Fi hotspots. All smartphones, and some other PDAs, can connect to Wireless Wide Area Networks, such as those provided by cellular telecommunications companies. Older PDAs from the 1990s to 2006 typically had an IrDA (infrared) port allowing short-range, line-of-sight wireless communication. Few current models use this technology, as it has been supplanted by Bluetooth and Wi-Fi. IrDA allows communication between two PDAs, or between a PDA and any device with an IrDA port or adapter. Some printers have IrDA receivers, allowing IrDA-equipped PDAs to print to them, if the PDA's operating system supports it. Universal PDA keyboards designed for these older PDAs use infrared technology. Infrared technology is low-cost and has the advantage of being allowed aboard.

Synchronization
Most PDAs can synchronize their data with applications on a user's computer. This allows the user to update contact, schedule, or other information on their computer, using software such as Microsoft Outlook or ACT!, and have that same data transferred to PDA—or transfer updated information from the PDA back to the computer. This eliminates the need for the user to update their data in two places. Synchronization also prevents the loss of information stored on the device if it is lost, stolen, or destroyed. When the PDA is repaired or replaced, it can be "re-synced" with the computer, restoring the user's data. Some users find that data input is quicker on their computer than on their PDA, since text input via a touchscreen or small-scale keyboard is slower than a full-size keyboard. Transferring data to a PDA via the computer is therefore a lot quicker than having to manually input all data on the handheld device.

Most PDAs come with the ability to synchronize to a computer. This is done through synchronization software provided with the handheld, or sometime with the computer's operating system. Examples of synchronization software include:

 HotSync Manager, for Palm OS PDAs
 Microsoft ActiveSync, used by Windows XP and older Windows operating systems to synchronize with Windows Mobile, Pocket PC, and Windows CE PDAs, as well as PDAs running iOS, Palm OS, and Symbian
 Microsoft Windows Mobile Device Center for Windows Vista, which supports Microsoft Windows Mobile and Pocket PC devices
 Apple iTunes, used on Mac OS X and Microsoft Windows to sync iOS devices (such as the iPhone and iPod touch)
 iSync, included with Mac OS X, can synchronize many SyncML-enabled PDAs
 BlackBerry Desktop Software, used to sync BlackBerry devices.

These programs allow the PDA to be synchronized with a personal information manager, which may be part of the computer's operating system, provided with the PDA, or sold separately by a third party. For example, the RIM BlackBerry comes with RIM's Desktop Manager program, which can synchronize to both Microsoft Outlook and ACT!. Other PDAs come only with their own proprietary software. For example, some early Palm OS PDAs came only with Palm Desktop, while later Palm PDAs—such as the Treo 650—have the ability to sync to Palm Desktop or Microsoft Outlook. Microsoft's ActiveSync and Windows Mobile Device Center only synchronize with Microsoft Outlook or a Microsoft Exchange server. Third-party synchronization software is also available for some PDAs from companies like CommonTime and CompanionLink.  Third-party software can be used to synchronize PDAs to other personal information managers that are not supported by the PDA manufacturers (for example, GoldMine and IBM Lotus Notes).

Wireless synchronization
Some PDAs can synchronize some or all of their data using their wireless networking capabilities, rather than having to be directly connected to a personal computer via a cable. Devices running Palm's webOS or Google's Android operating system primarily sync with the cloud. For example, if Gmail is used, information in contacts, email, and calendar can be synchronized between the PDA and Google's servers. RIM sells BlackBerry Enterprise Server to corporations so that corporate BlackBerry users can wirelessly synchronize their PDAs with the company's Microsoft Exchange Server, IBM Lotus Domino, or Novell GroupWise servers.  Email, calendar entries, contacts, tasks, and memos kept on the company's server are automatically synchronized with the BlackBerry.

Operating systems of PDAs
The most common operating systems pre-installed on PDAs are:

 Palm OS
 Microsoft Windows Mobile (Pocket PC) with a Windows CE kernel

Other, rarely used operating systems:

 EPOC, then Symbian OS (in mobile phone + PDA combos)
 Linux (e.g. VR3, iPAQ, Sharp Zaurus PDA, Opie, GPE, Familiar Linux etc.)
 Newton
 QNX (also on iPAQ)

Automobile navigation
Some PDAs include Global Positioning System (GPS) receivers; this is particularly true of smartphones. Other PDAs are compatible with external GPS-receiver add-ons that use the PDA's processor and screen to display location information. PDAs with GPS functionality can be used for automotive navigation. PDAs are increasingly being fitted as standard on new cars. PDA-based GPS can also display traffic conditions, perform dynamic routing, and show known locations of roadside mobile radar guns. TomTom, Garmin, and iGO offer GPS navigation software for PDAs.

Ruggedized
Some businesses and government organizations rely upon rugged PDAs, sometimes known as enterprise digital assistants (EDAs) or mobile computers, for mobile data applications. These PDAs have features that make them more robust and able to handle inclement weather, jolts and moisture. EDAs often have extra features for data capture, such as barcode readers, radio-frequency identification (RFID) readers, magnetic stripe card readers, or smart card readers. These features are designed to facilitate the use of these devices to scan in product or item codes.

Typical applications include:

 Access control and security
 Capital asset maintenance
 Facilities maintenance and management
 Infection control audit and surveillance within healthcare environments
 Medical treatment and recordkeeping in hospitals
 Meter reading by utilities
 Military (U.S. Army, Pakistan Army)
 Package delivery
 Park and wildlife rangers
 Parking enforcement
 Route accounting
 Supply chain management in warehouses
 Taxicab allocation and routing
 Waiter and waitress applications in restaurants and hospitality venues
 Wildlife biologists

Educational uses

PDAs and handheld devices are allowed in many classrooms for digital note-taking. Students can spell-check, modify, and amend their class notes on a PDA. Some educators distribute course material through the Internet or infrared file-sharing functions of the PDA. Textbook publishers have begun to release e-books, which can be uploaded directly to a PDA, reducing the number of textbooks students must carry. Brighton and SUSSEX Medical School in the UK was the first medical school to provide wide scale use of PDAs to its undergraduate students. The learning opportunities provided by having PDAs complete with a suite of key medical texts was studied with results showing that learning occurred in context with timely access to key facts and through consolidation of knowledge via repetition. The PDA was an important addition to the learning ecology rather than a replacement. Software companies have developed PDA programs to meet the instructional needs of educational institutions, such as dictionaries, thesauri, word processing software, encyclopedias, webinar and digital lesson planners.

Recreational uses
PDAs may be used by music enthusiasts to play a variety of music file formats. Many PDAs include the functionality of an MP3 player. Road rally enthusiasts can use PDAs to calculate distance, speed, and time. This information may be used for navigation, or the PDA's GPS functions can be used for navigation. Underwater divers can use PDAs to plan breathing gas mixtures and decompression schedules using software such as "V-Planner".

Models

Consumer

 Acer N Series
 AlphaSmart
 Amida Simputer
 Android-based devices
 Apple Newton
 Apple iPhone/iPad
 Atari Portfolio
 Dell Axim
 E-TEN
 Fujitsu-Siemens Pocket LOOX
 GMate Yopy
 Handspring
 HP iPAQ
 HTC (Dopod, Qtek)'s series of Windows Mobile PDAs/phones
 Huawei
 I-mate
 HP Jornada Pocket PC
 LifeDrive
 NEC MobilePro
 Osaris running EPOC OS distributed by Oregon Scientific
 Palm PDAs, such as Tungsten E2, TX, Treo, and Zire Handheld, as well as smartphones running on Palm OS and its successor WebOS, such as the Pre and Pixi.
 Philips Nino
 Casio Pocket Viewer
 PocketMail (email PDA with built-in acoustic coupler)
 Psion
 Roland PMA-5 (Personal Music Assistant)
 Royal (ezVue 7, etc.)
 Sharp Wizard and Sharp Zaurus
 Sony CLIÉ
 Sony Magic Link with the Magic Cap operating system
 Tapwave Zodiac
 Toshiba e310
 Abacus PDA Watch

Ruggedized

 American Industrial Systems (Mil-Spec, IP67)
 Bluebird 
 Catchwell
 Datalogic Mobile
 ecom instruments
 Getac
 Honeywell (Hand Held Products)
 Intermec
 M3 Mobile
 Motorola (Symbol Technologies)
 Psion Teklogix
 Skeye (Hoeft & Wessel AG)
 Trimble Navigation
 Two Technologies, Inc. (Ultra Rugged Handheld Computers)
 Unitech
 Chainway
 Newland

See also 

 Automotive navigation system
 Graffiti (Palm OS)
 Information appliance
 Medical calculator
 Pen computing
 Personal navigation assistant (PNA)
 Pocket-sized computing device

References

External links

 Annotated bibliography of references to gesture and pen computing
 epocalc's List of PDA manufacturers

 
Mobile computers
Information appliances
Time management